Selenochilus is a genus of beetles in the family Carabidae, endemic to New Zealand, including the following seven species:
 Selenochilus hinewai Larochelle & Larivière, 2013
 Selenochilus hutchisonae Larochelle & Larivière, 2013
 Selenochilus oculator (Broun, 1893)
 Selenochilus omalleyi Larochelle & Larivière, 2013
 Selenochilus piceus (Blanchard, 1843)
 Selenochilus ruficornis (Broun, 1882)
 Selenochilus syntheticus (Sharp, 1886)

References

Psydrinae